Deadline Design with Shaynna Blaze (commonly known as Deadline Design) is a 10-part Australian renovation television series which premiered on Wednesday, 19 October 2016 on Foxtel network LifeStyle HOME. The series sees interior designer Shaynna Blaze and her team visit everyday homes to help renovate them in time for a special occasion or event that is to be held at the house.

Production

The location of the series took place around Melbourne, Victoria with filming commencing in November 2015 and concluding in June 2016.

Synopsis

Shaynna Blaze helps everyday homeowners who need to have their home renovated on a budget of their own within a deadline for an event, e.g. baby arrival, milestone birthday, visiting relatives etc. Shaynna enlists the help of builder, Mike Griggs & designer, Yasmine Ghoniem.

Series Overview

Episodes

References

2010s Australian reality television series
2016 Australian television series debuts